The Diacria quadrangle is one of a series of 30 quadrangle maps of Mars used by the United States Geological Survey (USGS) Astrogeology Research Program. The quadrangle is located in the northwestern portion of Mars’ western hemisphere and covers 180° to 240° east longitude (120° to 180° west longitude) and 30° to 65° north latitude. The quadrangle uses a Lambert conformal conic projection at a nominal scale of 1:5,000,000 (1:5M). The Diacria quadrangle is also referred to as MC-2 (Mars Chart-2).  The Diacria quadrangle covers parts of Arcadia Planitia and Amazonis Planitia.

The quadrangle covers an approximate area of 4.9 million square km, or a little over 3% of Mars’ surface area. The Phoenix lander’s landing site (68.22° N, 234.25° E) lies about 186 km north of the northeastern quarter of the Diacria quadrangle. The landscape viewed by the Phoenix lander is probably representative of a large portion of the terrain in the northern Diacria quadrangle.

Origin of name
Diacria is the name of a telescopic albedo feature located at 48° N and 190° E on Mars. The feature was named by Greek astronomer E. M. Antoniadi in 1930 after Diacria, the highlands around Marathon  in north-west Attica, Greece. The name was approved by the International Astronomical Union (IAU) in 1958.

Physiography and geology
The Diacria quadrangle is located at the northwestern edge of the Tharsis volcanic plateau. Topographic, volcanic, and tectonic features associated with the large volcanoes Olympus Mons (south of map area) and Alba Mons (east of map area) characterize the southeastern and east central portions of the quadrangle.
The northern and western areas of the quadrangle lie in the northern lowland plains of Mars and cover portions of Amazonis Planitia (in the south), Arcadia Planitia (west central) and Vastitas Borealis (in the north). The large crater Milankovič (118.4 km in diameter) is located in the north central portion of the quadrangle at 54.7° N, 213.3° E.

Elevation data from the Mars Orbital Laser Altimeter (MOLA) instrument on the Mars Global Surveyor spacecraft shows that the regional terrain slopes gently downward to the northwest, with the highest elevation about 3.5 km (3,500 m) above datum (Mars "sea level") on the western flank of the Alba Mons volcano in the southeastern portion of the quadrangle. The lowest points in the quadrangle are about 4.5 km below datum (-4,500 m) in Vastitas Borealis in the northwest corner. The regional relief is thus about 8 km, but at a local scale, slopes are very shallow; the portion of Amazonis Planitia in the south central part of the quadrangle contains some of the flattest terrain on the entire planet.

What does the surface look like

Unlike some other places visited on Mars with landers (Viking and Pathfinder), nearly all the rocks near Phoenix are small. For about as far as the camera can see, the land is flat, but shaped into polygons between 2–3 meters in diameter and is bounded by troughs that are 20 cm to 50 cm deep. These shapes are due to ice in the soil expanding and contracting due to major temperature changes. The microscope showed that the soil on top of the polygons is composed of flat particles (probably a type of clay) and rounded particles. Also, unlike other places visited on Mars, the site has no ripples or dunes. Ice is present a few inches below the surface in the middle of the polygons, and along its edges, the ice is at least 8 inches deep. Pictures of the surface under the lander appear to show that the landing rockets may have exposed a layer of ice. When the ice is exposed to the Martian atmosphere it slowly sublimates. Some dust devils were observed.

Polygonal patterned ground

Polygonal, patterned ground is quite common in some regions of Mars.  It is commonly believed to be caused by the sublimation of ice from the ground. Sublimation is the direct change of solid ice to a gas.  This is similar to what happens to dry ice on the Earth.  Places on Mars that display polygonal ground may indicate where future colonists can find water ice.  Patterned ground forms in a mantle layer, called latitude dependent mantle, that fell from the sky when the climate was different.

Western flank of Alba Mons
The western flank of the Alba Mons volcano makes up the eastern and southeastern edge of the quadrangle. In terms of area, Alba Mons (formerly, Alba Patera) is the largest volcanic feature on Mars. The flank has a very low slope (l° or less) and is characterized by lava flows and an outwardly radiating array of ridges and channels. Some of the channels have a drainage pattern that resembles that formed by rain water on the slopes of terrestrial volcanoes. However, many other channels on the flanks of Alba Mons were clearly formed by flowing lava.
The western flank of the volcano also contains some NW-SE trending grabens (Cyane Fossae). An image from High Resolution Imaging Science Experiment (HiRISE) on the Mars Reconnaissance Orbiter (MRO) beautifully shows a line of rimless pit craters in Cyane Fossae. The pits may have formed by the collapse of surface materials into open fractures created as magma intruded the subsurface rock to form dikes.

Acheron Fossae

Near the southeast corner of the quadrangle (37° N, 225° E) lies a southward sloping, semicircular block of ancient, heavily cratered, highland crust that is dissected by numerous, arcuate troughs (Acheron Fossae). The troughs are grabens, structures formed when the crust moves downward between two faults. Grabens form in areas where the crust has undergone extensional stress. The Acheron Fossae region is partially covered by volcanic deposits from Alba Mons in the east, geologically young basaltic lava flows or sediments in the west and southeast, and the jumbled, furrowed terrain of Lycus Sulci in the south.

Lycus Sulci (Olympus Mons Aureole)
Lycus Sulci (24.6° N, 219° E) is the name applied to the northwestern portion of a larger terrain feature that partially encircles Olympus Mons and extends up to 750 km from the giant shield volcano’s base. This feature, called the Olympus Mons aureole, consists of several large lobes and has a distinctive corrugated or grooved surface texture. East of Olympus Mons, the aureole is partially covered by lava flows, but where it is exposed it goes by different names (Gigas Sulci, for example). The origin of the aureole remains debated, but it was likely formed by huge landslides or gravity-driven thrust sheets that sloughed off the edges of the Olympus Mons shield.

Erebus Montes

Westward from Lycus Sulci, across the flat plains of Amazonis Planitia, lies an elongated region of knobby terrain called Erebus Montes (Erebus Mountains). The region contains hundreds of clustered to isolated hillocks that stand 500 to 1,000 m above the surrounding plains. The presence of numerous partly filled "ghost" craters in the area indicates that the hills represent the high-standing remnants of ancient highland crust that was inundated by lava flows and (possibly) alluvial sediments from Tharsis in the southeast and the Elysium volcanic province to the west.

Arcadia Planitia and Southern Vastitas Borealis
North and east of the Erebus Montes are low-lying plains that characterize a large part of the Diacria Quadrangle and of the Martian northern hemisphere in general.
Medium resolution Mariner 9 and Viking spacecraft images from the 1970s show that large portions of Arcadia Planitia have an overall mottled (blotchy light and dark) appearance. At higher resolution, landforms commonly consist of lobate flow fronts; small channel segments; wrinkle ridges; pedestal craters; and low, isolated volcano-like hills with summit craters. MOLA images reveal numerous large, shallowly buried craters, suggesting that an old cratered surface lies under a layer of younger material.

At the resolution of the Mars Orbital Camera (MOC) on the Mars Global Surveyor spacecraft (around several m per pixel), much of the northern plains has a distinctly stippled, pitted texture that causes the ground to resemble the surface of a basketball or orange rind. This texture is likely caused by a mantle of ice and dust covering the landscape. The small hollows and pits formed as the ice evaporated (sublimed).

The geologic history and origin of the northern plains are complex and still poorly understood. Many of the landforms resemble periglacial features seen on Earth, such as moraines, ice-wedged polygons, and pingos. Arcadia Planitia and Vastitas Borealis likely consist of a hodgepodge of old lava flows, ice-related features, and reworked sediments of diverse origin. Some theorize that the northern plains were once covered by oceans or large lakes.

Expanded Craters
Large impacts often create swarms of small secondary craters from the debris that is blasted out as a consequence of the impact.  Studies of a type of secondary craters, called expanded craters,  have given us insights into places where abundant ice may be present in the ground. Expanded craters have lost their rims, this may be because any rim that was once present has collapsed into the crater during expansion or, lost its ice, if composed of ice.
Excess ice (ice in addition to what is in the pores of the ground) is widespread throughout the Martian mid-latitudes, especially in Arcadia Planitia.  In this region, are many expanded secondary craters that probably form from impacts that destabilize a subsurface layer of excess ice, which subsequently sublimates.  With sublimation the ice changes directly from a solid to gaseous form.  In the impact, the excess ice is broken up, resulting in an increase in surface area.  Ice will sublimate much more if there is more surface area.  After the ice disappears into the atmosphere, dry soil material will collapse and cause the crater diameter to become larger.  Places on Mars that display expanded craters may indicate where future colonists can find water ice.

Latitude dependent mantle

Much of the surface of Mars is covered by a thick smooth mantle that is thought to be a mixture of ice and dust.  This ice-rich mantle, a few yards thick, smooths the land.  Because there are few craters on this mantle, the mantle is relatively young.

Changes in Mars's orbit and tilt cause significant changes in the distribution of water ice from polar regions down to latitudes equivalent to Texas.  During certain climate periods water vapor leaves polar ice and enters the atmosphere. The water returns to the ground at lower latitudes as deposits of frost or snow mixed with dust. The atmosphere of Mars contains a great deal of fine dust particles.  Water vapor condenses on the particles, then they fall down to the ground due to the additional weight of the water coating.  When ice at the top of the mantling layer goes back into the atmosphere, it leaves behind dust, which insulates the remaining ice.

Ice exposed in new craters
A study reported in the journal Science in September 2009, shows that some newly formed craters have excavated clean, water ice from just below the surface in five locations on Mars. After a short time, the ice disappears, subliming into the atmosphere.  The ice is only a few meters deep.  The ice was confirmed with the Compact Imaging Spectrometer (CRISM) on board the Mars Reconnaissance Orbiter (MRO).  The ice was found in a total of 5 locations.  One of the locations (Site 5) is in the Diacria quadrangle at about 46° N, 182° E (Arcadia Planitia).
This discovery is significant because it shows the presence of subsurface ice at latitudes further south than expected and proves that future colonists on Mars will be able to obtain water from a wide variety of locations.  The ice can be dug up, melted, and then taken apart to provide fresh oxygen and hydrogen for rocket fuel.  Hydrogen was the powerful fuel used by the Space Shuttle main engines.

Dark slope streaks
Many places on Mars show dark streaks on steep slopes, such as crater walls.  It seems that the youngest streaks are dark and they become lighter with age.  Often they begin as a small narrow spot then widen and extend downhill for hundreds of meters.  Several ideas have been advanced to explain the streaks. Some involve water, or even the growth of organisms.  The streaks appear in areas covered with dust.  Much of the Martian surface is covered with dust because at more or less regular intervals dust settles out of the atmosphere covering everything.  We know a lot about this dust because the solar panels of Mars rovers get covered with dust.  The power of the Rovers has been saved many times by the wind, in the form of dust devils that have cleared the panels and boosted the power.  So we know that dust falls from the atmosphere frequently.

It is most generally accepted that the streaks represent avalanches of dust.  Streaks appear in areas covered with dust.  When a thin layer of dust is removed, the underlying surface appears dark.  Much of the Martian surface is covered with dust. Dust storms are frequent, especially when the spring season begins in the southern hemisphere.  At that time, Mars is 40% closer to the sun.  The orbit of Mars is much more elliptical then the Earth's.  That is the difference between the farthest point from the sun and the closest point to the sun is very great for Mars, but only slight for the Earth.  Also, every few years, the entire planet is engulfed in a global dust storm.  When NASA's Mariner 9 craft arrived there, nothing could be seen through the dust storm. Other global dust storms have also been observed, since that time.

Research, published in January 2012 in Icarus, found that dark streaks were initiated by airblasts from meteorites traveling at supersonic speeds. The team of scientists was led by Kaylan Burleigh, an undergraduate at the University of Arizona.  After counting some 65,000 dark streaks around the impact site of a group of 5 new craters, patterns emerged.  The number of streaks was greatest closer to the impact site.  So, the impact somehow probably caused the streaks. Also, the distribution of the streaks formed a pattern with two wings extending from the impact site.  The curved wings resembled scimitars, curved knives.  This pattern suggests that an interaction of airblasts from the group of meteorites shook dust loose enough to start dust avalanches that formed the many dark streaks.  At first it was thought that the shaking of the ground from the impact caused the dust avalanches, but if that was the case the dark streaks would have been arranged symmetrically around the impacts, rather than being concentrated into curved shapes.

Dark streaks can be seen in some of the images below.

Dust and dust devil tracks

Large portions of the martian surface are blanketed with bright reddish-ochre dust. The dust particles are typically less than 40 micrometres in size and are composed of iron oxide minerals. Data from the Thermal Emission Spectrometer (TES) on the Mars Global Surveyor spacecraft has allowed planetary scientists to estimate the amount of dust cover for broad swaths of the planet. In general, the Diacria quadrangle is extremely dusty, particularly in Arcadia Planitia and the region around the flank of Alba Mons and the Olympus Mons aureole in the southeastern portion of the quadrangle. A few large patches of relatively low dust cover occur in Amazonis Planitia and in the northwest corner of the quadrangle.

Many areas on Mars, including the Diacria quadrangle, experience the passage of giant dust devils.  When a dust devil goes by it blows away the coating of dust and exposes the underlying dark surface.  Dust devils have been seen from the ground and high overhead from orbit.  They have even blown the dust off of the solar panels of the two Rovers on Mars, thereby greatly extending their lives.  The twin Rovers were designed to last for 3 months, instead they both lasted more than six years, and one is still going.  The pattern of the tracks have been shown to change every few months.

Depressions in Milankovič crater

The triangular depressions visible in Milankovič crater contain water ice in the straight wall that faces the pole, according to a new study.  Eight sites were found with Milankovič crater being the only one in the northern hemisphere.  This discovery is important because the ice lies under only a meter or two of cover.  Research was conducted with instruments on board the Mars Reconnaissance Orbiter (MRO).

The following images are ones referred to in this study of subsurface ice sheets.

Gullies
Martian gullies are small, incised networks of narrow channels and their associated downslope sediment deposits, found on the planet of Mars. They are named for their resemblance to terrestrial gullies. First discovered on images from Mars Global Surveyor, they occur on steep slopes, especially on the walls of craters. Usually, each gully has a dendritic alcove at its head, a fan-shaped apron at its base, and a single thread of incised channel linking the two, giving the whole gully an hourglass shape. They are believed to be relatively young because they have few, if any craters. A subclass of gullies is also found cut into the faces of sand dunes which themselves considered to be quite young. 
On the basis of their form, aspects, positions, and location amongst and apparent interaction with features thought to be rich in water ice, many researchers believed that the processes carving the gullies involve liquid water. However, this remains a topic of active research.  The pictures below show examples of gullies in Diacria quadrangle.

Channels

There is enormous evidence that water once flowed in river valleys on Mars.  Images of curved channels have been seen in images from Mars spacecraft dating to the early 1970s with the Mariner 9 orbiter.  Indeed, a study published in June 2017, calculated that the volume of water needed to carve all the channels on Mars was even larger than the proposed ocean that the planet may have had.  Water was probably recycled many times from the ocean to rainfall around Mars.

Inverted relief
Inverted relief, inverted topography, or topographic inversion refers to landscape features that have reversed their elevation relative to other features.  It most often occurs when low areas of a landscape become filled with lava or sediment that hardens into material that is more resistant to erosion than the material that surrounds it.  Differential erosion then removes the less resistant surrounding material, leaving behind the younger resistant material, which may then appear as a ridge where previously there was a valley. Terms such as "inverted valley" or "inverted channel" are used to describe such features. Inverted relief has been observed on the surfaces of other planets as well as on Earth. For example, well-documented inverted topographies have been discovered on Mars.

Brain terrain
Brain terrain is common in many places on Mars.  It is formed when ice sublimates along cracks.  The ridges of brain terrain may contain a core of ice.  Shadow measurements from HiRISE indicate the ridges are 4–5 meters high.

Other scenes in Diacria quadrangle

Other Mars quadrangles

Interactive Mars map

See also

 Dark slope streak
 Dust Devil Tracks
 Expanded Craters
 Fossa (geology)
 HiRISE
 HiWish program
 Inverted relief
 List of quadrangles on Mars
 List of rocks on Mars
 Martian Gullies 
 Milankovic (Martian crater)
 Outflow channels
 Valley networks (Mars)
 Phoenix lander 
 Polygonal patterned ground
 Volcanism on Mars
 Water on Mars

References

External links 
 High resolution video by Seán Doran of a flyover of crater Domoni (51.7° N, 125.6° W)
 Chris McKay: Results of the Phoenix Mission to Mars and Analog Sites on Earth

 
Mars